Buomesca Tué Na Bangna (born 6 May 1993), commonly known as Mesca, is a professional footballer who plays as a midfielder for Cypriot side Doxa Katokopias. Born in Guinea-Bissau, Mesca has represented Portugal internationally at youth level.

Club career
Born in Bissau, Guinea-Bissau, Mesca began his career at Sporting CP before joining Chelsea in May 2010. He joined Chelsea's rivals Fulham on a one-year professional contract in September 2011 that ran until June 2012. He signed a new three-year contract with the club in April 2013.

Ahead of the 2012–13 season, Mesca was included in a pre-season friendly squad with the first team. He made his Premier League debut in Fulham's 2–0 defeat away to Chelsea on 21 September 2013.

On 28 November 2013, Mesca joined Crewe Alexandra on loan until 7 January 2014. He scored his first senior goal against Carlisle United in a 2–1 win on 1 January 2014, and manager Steve Davis considered bringing him back to Gresty Road afterwards.

After playing no part in the previous season for Fulham, Mesca left for AEL Limassol of the Cypriot First Division on 7 August 2015. Five days later he made his debut, playing the entirety of the Cypriot Super Cup against APOEL FC, a penalty shootout victory after a goalless draw.

On 11 June 2018, Mesca signed with Bulgarian club Beroe Stara Zagora.

In August 2019, he joined Cypriot team Doxa Katokopias.

International career
Mesca has represented Portugal at youth level. He was selected to the preliminary Guinea-Bissau squad for the 2017 Africa Cup of Nations.

Personal life
Mesca is the brother of PSV winger Bruma.

Career statistics

Honours
AEL
Cypriot Super Cup: 2015

References

External links

Fulham F.C. profile

1993 births
Living people
Sportspeople from Bissau
Bissau-Guinean footballers
Portuguese footballers
Portugal youth international footballers
Association football midfielders
Sporting CP footballers
Chelsea F.C. players
Fulham F.C. players
Crewe Alexandra F.C. players
AEL Limassol players
PFC Beroe Stara Zagora players
Doxa Katokopias FC players
Premier League players
English Football League players
Cypriot First Division players
First Professional Football League (Bulgaria) players
Portuguese expatriate footballers
Portuguese expatriate sportspeople in England
Expatriate footballers in England
Portuguese expatriate sportspeople in Cyprus
Expatriate footballers in Cyprus
Portuguese expatriate sportspeople in Bulgaria
Expatriate footballers in Bulgaria
Portuguese people of Bissau-Guinean descent